Firedemon is the second full-length album by the death metal band, Carnal Forge. It was released in 2000.

Track listing

"Too Much Hell Ain't Enough for Me" - 2:20
"Covered with Fire (I'm Hell)" - 4:09
"I Smell Like Death (Son of a Bastard)" - 2:59
"Chained" - 2:51
"Defacer" - 3:05
"Pull the Trigger" - 2:30
"Uncontrollable" - 3:16
"Firedemon" - 2:26
"Cure of Blasphemy" - 2:56
"Headfucker" - 3:29
"The Torture Will Never Stop" - 2:03
"A Revel in Violence" - 2:45

Tracks 5 and 11 composed by  Kjellgren. All other tracks composed by Kjellgren, Kuusisto, Magnusson and Westerberg.

Personnel
 Jonas Kjellgren - Vocals
 Jari Kuusisto - Guitars
 Johan Magnusson - Guitars
 Stefan Westerberg - Drums
 Petri Kuusisto - Bass

Notes

2000 albums
Carnal Forge albums